Nesstar Publisher was an advanced data management program maintained by the Norwegian Social Science Data Services  (also known as NSD) until its end-of-life in 2022. The Nesstar tool suite consisted of a Nesstar Repository, Nesstar WebView, a Nesstar Editor, and the Nesstar Explorer as the user interface.

The NESSTAR project began in 1998 as a European Union-funded collaboration between the NSD, the UK Data Archive and the Danish Data Archive (DDA) of the Danish National Archives. The Nesstar Publisher was beta-released in 1999 and its first full release was in January 2000. From 2001, the software was maintained by Nesstar Ltd., a wholly-owned subsidiary of the UK Data Archive and the NSD, based at the University of Essex and the University of Bergen.

Software features
Nesstar's goal was to facilitate data sharing, providing tools for the preparation, curation, and dissemination of research data and related research outputs.  

Nesstar data and metadata tools included metadata extraction from statistical software file formats (SPSS, NSDstat and Stata) into the Data Documentation Initiative (DDI) metadata standard for social research data, as well as conversion of SPSS metadata into DDI.

Reception
The NESSTAR Project was an early player in the development of internet-supported research data management. The project also contributed to creating and maintaining the DDI metadata standard. Also, as one of the earliest research data management tools developed specifically for social science research, Nesstar tools were adopted widely by the international community. 
Data repositories such as Statistics Canada, <odesi>, the European Social Survey data repository  etc, were built on Nesstar tools.

References

Data management software
European Union and science and technology
Data collection in research
Social statistics data
University of Essex
University of Bergen